Ante Tomić (born 17 February 1987) is a Croatian professional basketball player who plays for Joventut Badalona of the Spanish Liga ACB. He has also represented the senior Croatian national team in international competitions.

Professional career

Zagreb (2004–2010) 
Tomić started playing basketball in his native city, Dubrovnik, and in 2004 signed for Zagreb. It was in the Croatia's capital that he made his name, both at home and abroad. In Zagreb, he won the Croatian Cup (2008), and was league Adriatic League's MVP in 2009. In 2008, he was a second-round pick in the NBA Draft for Utah Jazz, but his future was in the Liga Endesa.

Real Madrid (2010–2012) 

In January 2010, Tomić moved to Real Madrid for three seasons. In his first season at Real Madrid, the Croatian centre played sixteen games in the regular Liga ACB season, averaging 8 points and 5.4 rebounds in a total of 348 minutes. He played in eight play-off games, averaging 9.5 points and 5.9 rebounds. His EuroLeague stats were very similar. He scored an average of 11 points per game and also had 3.6 rebounds and made 1.7 steals.

In the 2010–11 season, he played 32 ACB regular-season games, getting 10 points and four rebounds a game, in a total of 613 minutes of play. In the play-offs, in six games, he had 10 points and 5.6 rebounds. Tomić thus completed his finest Liga Endesa (ACB) season yet, and was named to the All-Liga ACB Team. In 2011–12, his team won the Copa del Rey, beating Barça Regal in the final at the Palau Sant Jordi. In the play-offs, he was on court in 12 games and collected similar stats: he left Real Madrid with 7.25 points and 6 rebounds. After the third year, the all-whites opted not to extend his contract.

Barcelona (2012–2020) 
On 5 July 2012, Tomić signed with Barça Regal for three seasons, with an option for one more. In the Euroleague 2012–13 season, he was named to the All-EuroLeague First Team, and in the 2012–13 ACB season, he was included to the All-Liga ACB Team.

In March 2014, Tomić became the first player ever to receive the EuroLeague MVP of the Month award twice in a row, and even twice in the same season. In May 2014, he was named to the All-EuroLeague First Team, for the second year in a row.

On 27 April 2015, he agreed to a new tentative three-year deal with Barcelona. In May 2015, he was chosen to the All-EuroLeague Second Team for his performances over the season. Statistically, he had his best season since joining Barcelona, averaging 11.5 points, and career-highs of 7.1 rebounds and 2.3 assists per game, over 28 games played in the EuroLeague.

On 16 June 2015, he signed a three-year contract extension with Barcelona. Barcelona eventually finished the season losing in the final series of the Spanish League championship, after a 3–0 series sweep loss to Real Madrid. In June 2018 he resigned with Barcelona which was reported to be a two-year deal. On 2 July 2020, Tomić announced on his Instagram account that he was parting ways with the club after eight seasons.

Joventut (2020–present) 
On 19 July 2020, Tomić signed with Joventut in Spain.

NBA draft rights 
Tomić was drafted by the Utah Jazz in the second round of the 2008 NBA draft. On 18 November 2020, his draft rights were traded to the New York Knicks. On February 9, 2023, Tomić's draft rights were traded to the Portland Trail Blazers in a four-team trade involving the Knicks, Philadelphia 76ers and Charlotte Hornets.

National team career 
Tomić played with Croatia, at both the junior and senior levels of competition. In 2009, he won the gold medal at the Mediterranean Games in Pescara, Italy, and as a full international, he appeared in numerous competitions in which the senior Croatian national team qualified. He competed at the World Championship in Turkey, in 2010, at the EuroBasket in Lithuania, in 2011, and at the EuroBasket in Slovenia, in 2013. He also played at the 2014 FIBA World Cup, in Spain. After representing Croatia at the EuroBasket 2015, where they were eliminated in the eighth finals by the Czech Republic, he announced his retirement from national team competitions.

Career statistics

EuroLeague 

|-
| style="text-align:left;"|2009–10
| style="text-align:left;" rowspan="3"|Real Madrid
| 9 || 7 || 21.8 || .616 || .000 || .643 || 3.6 || .9 || .1 || 1.1 || 11.0 || 10.7
|-
| style="text-align:left;"|2010–11
| 23 || 22 || 21.1 || .503 || .000 || .667 || 5.3 || 1.1 || .6 || .6 || 9.9 || 10.7
|-
| style="text-align:left;"|2011–12
| 15 || 12 || 14.6 || .543 || .000 || .650 || 3.7 || .7 || .1 || .6 || 6.7 || 6.9
|-
| style="text-align:left;"|2012–13
| style="text-align:left;" rowspan="5"|Barcelona
| 30 || 25 || 24.0 || .638 || .000 || .607 || 6.5 || 1.7 || .7 || 1.1 || 11.7 || 16.8
|-
| style="text-align:left;"|2013–14
| 29 || 28 || 22.4 || .629 || .000 || .667 || 6.4 || 2.1 || .5 || .6 || 11.7 || 15.8
|-
| style="text-align:left;"|2014–15
| 28 || 27 || 24.2 || .609 || .000 || .688 || 7.1 || 2.3 || .6 || .8 || 11.5 || 18.0
|-
| style="text-align:left;"|2015–16
| 29 || 22 || 20.3 || .599 || .000 || .707 || 5.4 || 1.9 || .4 || .2 || 10.3 || 13.9
|-
| style="text-align:left;"|2016–17
| 29 || 28 || 21.5 || .528 || .000 || .495 || 5.9 || 2.0 || .6 || .7 || 8.8 || 13.0
|- class="sortbottom"
| style="text-align:center;" colspan="2"|Career
| 163 || 143 || 21.7 || .596 || .000 || .669 || 5.8 || 1.7 || .5 || .7 || 10.7 || 14.2

References

External links 
 Ante Tomić at acb.com 

 Ante Tomić at draftexpress.com
 Ante Tomić at eurobasket.com
 Ante Tomić at euroleague.net
 Ante Tomić at fibaeurope.com
 Ante Tomić at realmadrid.com 

1987 births
Living people
2010 FIBA World Championship players
2014 FIBA Basketball World Cup players
ABA League players
Centers (basketball)
Competitors at the 2009 Mediterranean Games
Croatian expatriate basketball people in Spain
Croatian men's basketball players
FC Barcelona Bàsquet players
Joventut Badalona players
KK Zagreb players
Liga ACB players
Mediterranean Games medalists in basketball
Mediterranean Games gold medalists for Croatia
Real Madrid Baloncesto players
Basketball players from Dubrovnik
Utah Jazz draft picks